Guadalupito is a town in Northern Peru, capital of the district of Guadalupito in the region La Libertad. This town is located about 118 km south of Trujillo city and is primarily an agricultural center in the Chao Valley.

See also
Chavimochic
Virú Valley
Virú
Moche valley
Chao

External links
Location of Guadalupito by Wikimapia

References

  
Populated places in La Libertad Region